The JAPW New Jersey State Championship was a title in the Jersey All Pro Wrestling professional wrestling promotion. It became an official title on September 25, 1998.  Flash Wheeler become the first champion in a 20-man battle royal.  It was retired on June 7, 2002 and was replaced with the JAPW Television Championship. On September 15, 2006, Frankie Kazarian was declared the New Jersey State Champion after the JAPW Light Heavyweight Championship was retired. 

The final champion was Brodie Lee.  He won the title on May 22, 2010 at Notorious Thunder in career vs. titles match.  The Hillbilly Wrecking Crew (Brodie Lee and Necro Butcher's JAPW careers were on the line while Charlie Haas (JAPW New Jersey State Champion) and Dan Maff (JAPW Heavyweight Champion were on the line.  Lee pinned Haas to win the title.

Title history

Names

Reigns

|}

Combined reigns

See also
Jersey All Pro Wrestling
JAPW Heavyweight Championship
JAPW Light Heavyweight Championship
JAPW Television Championship

References

External links
Solie.org JAPW New Jersey State Championship history on Solie.org
JAPW New Jersey State Championship history via Wayback Machine
New
State professional wrestling championships